Timothy Archambault (also known as Tim Archambault; born Willimantic, Connecticut, United States, February 9, 1971) is a Native American flutist, architect, and composer.

Background
Archambault is a member of the Kichesipirini Algonquin First Nation. He graduated with two degrees (bachelor of architecture and bachelor of fine arts) from the Rhode Island School of Design, taking courses in music theory at Brown University during this time.

Musical career
Archambault began playing the Native American flute in 1989 and has devoted intensive study to the earliest recordings of the instrument, dating back to the early 20th century. He has also studied informally with the Native American flutists Kevin Locke (Lakota) and Edmund Wayne Nevaquaya (Comanche), and has collected songs of his Kichesipirini heritage, from elders in Canada as well as from archival wax cylinder recordings made in the early 20th century.

In addition to performing in traditional styles, since the early 21st century he has achieved notoriety for being one of the few Native American flutists to perform contemporary classical music on the instrument. He is able to play complex chromatic music on the Native American flute, and is the first enrolled member of a North American indigenous nation to master this style. He has performed the music of Native American composers David Yeagley, George Quincy, and Raven Chacon. His recording of Yeagley's Wessi vah-peh, for Native American flute and orchestra, performed with the National Polish Radio Symphony Orchestra Katowice, will be released by Opus One Records in late 2008. He was the first person to use the old warble technique (in which a single flute tone "splits" into a multiphonic oscillation) within the context of contemporary classical music.

Archambault is planning to record, in late 2008, a solo album of compositions by David Yeagley entitled Suite Tragique which is dedicated to the Kichesipirini Algonquin First Nation, as well as a collaborative composition utilizing traditional Anishinaabeg musical notation with the Navajo composer Raven Chacon. He recorded an orchestral work entitled The Choctaw Diaries by the Choctaw composer George Quincy, which was released by Lyrichord Classical on June 17, 2008. In 2008, he joined an all-Native American orchestra called The Coast Orchestra.

As a composer, in the spring of 2007 he composed a work for solo cello for the Mohawk cellist, as a part of her North American Indian Cello Project; this work will be released on CD in late 2008.

Archambault is a member of the First Nations Composer Initiative and performed at the National Museum of the American Indian in Washington, D.C. in November 2006. In August 2007, he recorded traditional Kichesipirini flute songs for the National Museum of the American Indian archives, and in 2008 he was one of the First Nations Composer Initiative judge panelists who awarded several grants to American Indian musicians.

Architectural career
Archambault lives in Beijing, China, where he is a project manager at the Beijing office of the Office for Metropolitan Architecture; he is currently designing a large-scale architectural project in Southeast Asia. Before taking this position he worked as a Project Architect in Rotterdam and New York City, working on the designs for the Prada Soho Store, the Lehmann Maupin Gallery in Chelsea, Manhattan (commissioned in 2001 and completed in 2002), and the Dee and Charles Wyly Theatre at the Dallas Center for the Performing Arts in Dallas, Texas (commissioned in 2004 and scheduled to be completed in 2008). Prior to joining OMA in 1999, and helping to establish its New York office, he worked for Pasanella+Klein Stolzman+Berg Architects in New York on the Pratt Stabile Hall Dormitory, and for Frank O. Gehry and Associates in Los Angeles on the Samsung Museum of Contemporary Art and the Walt Disney Concert Hall.

Personal life
Archambault is a hereditary senator of the Kichesipirini Algonquin First Nation, and is active in tribal issues, keeping close ties with the nation, which is based in Pembroke, Ontario. He is married to fine-art photographer CYJO.

References

External links
"American Indian Composers Go Classical", by Felix Contreras, from All Things Considered, January 1, 2009

Native American composers
Native American flautists
Native American architects
1971 births
Living people
Algonquin people
20th-century American architects
American male classical composers
American classical composers
Rhode Island School of Design alumni
People from Willimantic, Connecticut
20th-century classical composers
21st-century classical composers
21st-century American composers
20th-century American composers
20th-century American male musicians
21st-century American male musicians
21st-century American architects
Rhode Island School of Design alumni in music
20th-century flautists
21st-century flautists